Pouteria moaensis is a species of plant in the family Sapotaceae. It is endemic to Cuba.  It is threatened by habitat loss.

References

moaensis
Endemic flora of Cuba
Endangered flora of North America
Taxonomy articles created by Polbot